Gerry McHugh  (born 9 October 1957) is a republican politician in Northern Ireland. He represented Sinn Féin on Fermanagh District Council from 1993 to 2007 sat as an independent since then. He was elected to the Northern Ireland Forum in 1996, then to the Northern Ireland Assembly at the 1998 election as a Sinn Féin member for Fermanagh and South Tyrone. He lost his seat in 2003, but regained it in 2007. His fellow Sinn Féin member on both occasions was Michelle Gildernew. McHugh is a past pupil of St Comhghall's Secondary School in Lisnaskea.

He became an independent on 29 November 2007, citing his perceived problems with lack of democracy in his former party.

On 30 November 2009, he announced that he was a member of Fianna Fáil. He did not contest the 2011 Assembly election, and lost his District Council seat in the 2011 local elections.

On 2 February 2019 The Impartial Reporter reported that McHugh had joined Aontú, a new pro-life nationalist party founded by Peadar Tóibín. In the May 2019 local election, he was the party's candidate stood in the six-seat Erne East District Electoral Area for Fermanagh and Omagh District Council, finishing last of ten candidates.

References

External links
 NIA profile

1957 births
Living people
Members of the Northern Ireland Forum
Sinn Féin MLAs
Independent members of the Northern Ireland Assembly
Northern Ireland MLAs 1998–2003
Northern Ireland MLAs 2007–2011
Fianna Fáil politicians
People educated at St Comhghall's Secondary School
Aontú politicians
Members of Fermanagh District Council
Sinn Féin councillors in Northern Ireland
Sinn Féin parliamentary candidates